Geotrupidae (from Greek γῆ (gē), earth, and τρῡπητής (trȳpētēs), borer) is a family of beetles in the order Coleoptera. They are commonly called earth-boring dung beetles or dor beetles. Most excavate burrows in which to lay their eggs. They are typically detritivores, provisioning their nests with leaf litter (often moldy), but are occasionally coprophagous, similar to dung beetles. The eggs are laid in or upon the provision mass and buried, and the developing larvae feed upon the provisions. The burrows of some species can exceed 2 metres in depth.

A few species communicate by stridulation (rubbing body parts together to make sounds).

Classification
They were originally classified as the subfamily Geotrupinae in the family Scarabaeidae before being elevated to a family. Traditionally the family Bolboceratidae was included (as the subfamily Bolboceratinae) on the basis of the number of antenna segments, but examination of a different set of characteristics prompted Scholtz & Browne (1995) to elevate Bolboceratidae to a family, a result supported by recent phylogenetic research.

The family has more than 600 species in about 30 genera in two subfamilies; recent phylogenetic studies indicate that Taurocerastinae is not related to Geotrupinae, and is instead more closely related to Lucanidae and Diphyllostomatidae.

 Geotrupinae
 Allotrupes Boucomont, 1912
 Anoplotrupes Jekel, 1866
 Baraudia López-Colón, 1996
 Ceratophyus Fischer von Waldheim,  1823
 Ceratotrupes Jekel, 1865
 Chelotrupes Jekel, 1866
 Cnemotrupes Jekel, 1866
 Cretogeotrupes Nikolajev, 1992
 Enoplotrupes Lucas, 1869
 Geohowdenius Zunino, 1984
 Geotrupes Latreille, 1796
 Halffterius Zunino, 1984
 Haplogeotrupes Nikolaev, 1979
 Jekelius López-Colón, 1989
 Lethrus Scopoli, 1777
 Megatrupes Zunino, 1984
 Mycotrupes LeConte, 1866
 Odontotrypes Fairmaire, 1887
 Onthotrupes Howden, 1964
 Phelotrupes Jekel, 1866
 Peltotrupes Blanchard, 1888
 Pseudotrypocopris Miksic, 1954
 Sericotrupes Zunino, 1984
 Silphotrupes Jekel, 1866
 Thorectes Mulsant, 1842
 Trypocopris Motschulsky, 1860
 Typhaeus Leach, 1815
 Zuninoeus López-Colón, 1989
 Taurocerastinae
 Frickius Germain, 1897
 Taurocerastes Philippi, 1866

References

External links
 D. Jonathan Browne and Clarke H. Scholtz, Bolboceratidae, from the Tree of Life
 Key to the British species of family Geotrupidae
 Video of Geotrupes from Hungary
UNL. Geotrupidae

 
Beetle families
Articles containing video clips